Sergeant John Brosnan (July 1, 1846 – August 7, 1921) was an Irish soldier who fought in the American Civil War. Brosnan received the United States' highest award for bravery during combat, the Medal of Honor, for his action during the Second Battle of Petersburg in Virginia on 17 July 1864. He was honored with the award on 18 January 1894.

Biography
Brosnan was born in Ireland on 1 July 1846. He enlisted in the 164th New York Infantry as a private on 2 August 1862. The 164th, along with the 155th New York Infantry, 170th New York Infantry, 175th New York Infantry, and 182nd New York Infantry, made up a brigade of Irish soldiers referred to as Corcoran's Legion. It was while he was a sergeant in command of his company that he performed the act of gallantry that earned him the Medal of Honor. On the morning of 17 June 1864, Brosnan responded to the groans of a member of his company, Corporal Michael Carroll, who had been wounded by hidden rebels and lay exposed to heavy fire from the enemy. Under fire Brosnan carried out a successful attempt to rescue Carroll by lifting him on his arms and out of the line of fire. Brosnan, too, was wounded in this rescue, subsequently losing an arm. He was discharged as a result of his wounds in February 1865.

After the war, Brosnan resided in New York and died on 7 August 1921. His remains are interred at the Holy Cross Cemetery in Brooklyn.

Medal of Honor citation

See also

List of American Civil War Medal of Honor recipients: A–F

References

1846 births
1921 deaths
Irish-born Medal of Honor recipients
People of New York (state) in the American Civil War
Union Army officers
United States Army Medal of Honor recipients
American Civil War recipients of the Medal of Honor